Lively Island is the largest of the Lively Island Group of the Falkland Islands, The island group lies east of East Falkland.  Lively Island is the largest rat-free island in the Falklands, hence its importance to birdlife. The island also has a sheep farm.

History
The Spanish name, "Isla Bougainville" (like Port Louis) is named after the French navigator Louis de Bougainville who established the first settlement in the archipelago in the 1760s.

In the late 19th and early 20th centuries the island was owned by George Cobb. It was sold after World War I to pay taxes.

In the Falklands War the Battle of Seal Cove took place near Lively Island. Seal Cove is a bay in East Falkland directly to the west of the island.

Description
There are several streams and ponds, the largest of which is Enderby Pond, an important waterfowl site. Lively is rat-free but with a century and a half of grazing little tussac grass remains and there are many large patches of eroded ground.

Lively Island is surrounded by other, smaller islands  and islets in the Lively Island group. Some of these Islets are linked to Lively Island by sandbars. (The rest of the Lively islands are rat free.)

Important Bird Area
The Lively Island group has been identified by BirdLife International as an Important Bird Area. Birds for which the site is of conservation significance include Falkland steamer ducks, ruddy-headed geese, gentoo penguins (650 breeding pairs), Magellanic penguins, southern giant petrels (40 pairs), white-bridled finches, blackish cinclodes and Cobb's wrens.

References

 Stonehouse, B (ed.) Encyclopedia of Antarctica and the Southern Oceans (2002)

External links
 
 Instagram page of Lively Island - includes information and pictures about farming on Lively's and wildlife

Islands of the Falkland Islands
Important Bird Areas of the Falkland Islands
Seabird colonies
Penguin colonies